"What She Is (Is a Woman in Love)" is a song written by Bob McDill and Paul Harrison and recorded by American country music artist Earl Thomas Conley. It was released in February 1988 as the lead single from the album The Heart of It All. The song Conley's fifteenth number one on the country chart.  The single went to number one for one week and spent a total of thirteen weeks on the country chart.

Charts

"What She Is (Is a Woman in Love)" debuted on the U.S. Billboard Hot Country Singles for the week of March 12, 1988.

Weekly charts

Year-end charts

References

1988 singles
Earl Thomas Conley songs
Songs written by Bob McDill
Song recordings produced by Emory Gordy Jr.
RCA Records singles
1988 songs